Edmund Lowell Jenkins is a leading accountant in the United States.  He was chairman of the Financial Accounting Standards Board during a period in which it addressed controversial issues by adopting a standard for derivative accounting and eliminating pooling-of-interest accounting for U.S. publicly traded firms.

He was one of two individuals inducted into the Accounting Hall of Fame in 2005.

References
Edmund L. Jenkins biography at OSU's Accounting Hall of Fame.

Year of birth missing (living people)
Living people
American accountants
Financial Accounting Standards Board members